The Willingen Five 2018 was the first edition of Willingen Five, a three-day tournament for men in ski jumping in Willingen between 2–4 February 2018. It was part of the 2017/18 World Cup season. A total of five rounds counted in the final standings: Friday's qualification round, two individual competition rounds from Saturday and two from Sunday. The Willingen Five overall winner was awarded with an extra €25,000. The director of the competition was Tobias Lindner.

The competition was founded by the President of SC Wilingen, Jürgen Hensel, and World Cup director Walter Hofer.

Competition

Format

Schedule

Individual

Standings

Willingen Five

References 

2018 in ski jumping
2018 in German sport
February 2018 sports events in Germany